Simpson Pavilion, or Bend Simpson Pavilion, is a sports pavilion in Bend, Oregon, United States. Plans were unveiled in late 2013, and construction began in late 2014. The project includes a $11.3 million ice rink, and courts for basketball, tennis, and volleyball, among other sports.

References

Buildings and structures in Bend, Oregon
Sports venues in Oregon